Trần Thị Hà Phương (born 31 March 1972) better known as Hà Phương, is a Vietnamese singer and actress. She is the second oldest sister of three singing sisters: Cẩm Ly, who runs a Saigon record company, and Vietnamese pop star Minh Tuyết.

Early life
Phuong grew up in Saigon, South Vietnam, where she dreamed of being a performer, but was also a shy and timid child.

Phuong and her sisters represented their school in local and nationwide singing competitions in Vietnam. They also got airplay on VPOP (Vietnamese pop music) stations.

Career

Music
After she graduated from high school, Phuong enrolled in the College of Arts and Culture, District 10 Culture House, where she took dance and music classes. She also took private vocal classes and studied Vietnamese/Broadway musicals.

Phuong got her start performing at various entertainment venues in Vietnam:

She got her big break when her song "Hoa Cau Vuon Trau" was played during halftime of the 1994 World Cup, which was broadcast in Vietnam. She has released 12 solo albums in Vietnam and the U.S.

Book
Phuong wrote a book in 2017 titled Finding Julia, which was inspired by her life. In the book, a Eurasian acting student is haunted by the death of her mother, and her own secret desires.

Film
A film version of "Finding Julia"—starring Phuong, Andrew McCarthy and Richard Chamberlain—premiered on October 28, 2017 at the Third Annual Asian World Film Festival in Los Angeles.

Phuong, who studied acting at the TVI Actors Studio in New York,  found making the film a challenge:

The film included her English language song “Lost in a Dream."

Personal life
Phuong is married to Blackstone Group managing director Chinh Chu. They live in New York City with their two young daughters, Diana Phương Chu and Angelina Tieu Phương Chu.

Moving from Vietnam to the U.S. was an adjustment for Phuong:

Phuong is still pursuing her artistic endeavors:

Philanthropy
All the profits from Phương's DVD/CD sales, concerts and films go to fund the Ha Phuong Foundation.

Phuong created the foundation in 2008 to help underprivileged children with their housing, surgery, food, clothing, and education. The foundation also funds instruments, vocational training and career development for blind children.

Phuong sponsors the Ha Phuong Young Female Filmmakers Initiative, which is administered by the non-profit New York Women in Film and Television. The initiative includes a training program for recent high school grads, financial assistance for graduate students and an apprenticeship program for women entering the film and TV industry.

Phuong contributes to the Vietnam Relief Effort, a non-profit organization created by her husband and his sister. The charity helps fund Vietnamese schools, surgeries for war veterans/disabled people, and brings Vietnamese doctors to the U.S. for medical training.

Albums
Bông Ô Môi
Tình đẹp Hậu Giang
Ca dao em và tôi

References

External links

Finding Julia

1972 births
Living people
21st-century Vietnamese women singers